Blackburn Rovers Football Club was founded in 1875, first entered the FA Cup four years later, and became a founder member of the Football League in 1888 and of the Premier League in 1992. The club's first team have been English champions three times, and have won six FA Cups, one Football League Cup and one Full Members' Cup. All players who have made 100 or more appearances in nationally or internationally organised competitive matches for the club should be listed below.

Each player's details include the duration of his Rovers career, his typical playing position while with the club, and the number of games played and goals scored in domestic league matches and in all senior competitive matches. Where applicable, the list also includes the national team(s) for which the player was selected.

Key
Players are listed in chronological order according to the year in which they first played for the club, and then by alphabetical order of their surname.
Appearances as a substitute are included.
Statistics are correct up to and including the end of the 2021–22 Blackburn Rovers F.C. season.

Players with 100 or more appearances

Notes 

Player statistics include games played while on loan from clubs listed below. Unless individually sourced, loaning clubs come from the appearances source.

Sources

References 

Players
 
Blackburn Rovers
Association football player non-biographical articles